Forest for the Trees is the debut studio album by Forest for the Trees. It was released through DreamWorks Records on September 9, 1997. It peaked at number 190 on the Billboard 200 chart and number 16 on the Heatseekers Albums chart. "Dream" was released as a single, peaking at number 72 on the Billboard Hot 100 chart and number 18 on the Modern Rock Tracks chart.

Background
Forest for the Trees' Carl Stephenson co-wrote and co-produced Beck's 1993 song "Loser". Signed to Geffen Records at that time, Stephenson submitted an entire album of songs. After recording the album, Stephenson was hospitalized with a mental illness. Stephenson, his family and the label thought it best not to release the album at the time. However, his health condition improved afterward and they thought that releasing the album would help him deal financially and emotionally with the healing process.

Release
The album was released through DreamWorks Records, Geffen Records' sister label, on September 9, 1997. Prior to the release of the album, "Dream" was released as a single. Kevin Godley directed the music video for the song. In the music video, Stephenson was seen briefly in a still photograph.

Critical reception

Kembrew McLeod of AllMusic says, "Forest for the Trees tries to be everything at once and ends up being nothing at all, pleasing only those who favor 'interesting in theory' collage-oriented music over some semblance of catchy songs." Meanwhile, James Lien of CMJ New Music Report called Carl Stephenson "one of the key architects of the zeitgeist of the times." He said, "Stephenson creates a musical world where hip-hop beats blend with bagpipes and B-movie sitars, acoustic folk guitar strums, found vocal samples and hazy, dazed stoner raps."

Track listing

Personnel
Credits adapted from liner notes.

 Carl Stephenson – production, arrangement, recording, engineering, mixing
 John "Coz" Acosta  – production, drum programming, guitar, vocals, engineering, mixing
 Bob Ludwig – mastering
 Melissa Komorsky – executive production, management
 Adam Katz – management assistance
 Tony Berg – A&R direction
 Thunk! – art direction
 Eleonora Ghioldi – photography
 Mark Schultz – front cover collage
 Mark Peterson – back cover painting

Charts

References

External links
 

1997 albums
DreamWorks Records albums